"Rough Water" is a song by American rapper Travie McCoy featuring American singer-songwriter and guitarist Jason Mraz. It was released digitally as a single on September 13, 2013 through Fueled by Ramen.

Lyrics

The song is based on two lovers in a long distance relationship, where McCoy says they're on the same sphere despite 3 months apart, while Mraz sings the lines 'Never let go of me, Hold tight, It's gonna get hard to breathe" in an emotional hook. The song also features many references to the 1998 film Titanic, i.e. "loose lips sink ships, that's what someone told me, but this boat can stay afloat as long as you hold me".

Music Video
The music video was premiered on October 11, 2013. The video was filmed in New York City.

Track listing

Charts

References

2013 singles
2013 songs
Travie McCoy songs
Jason Mraz songs